Jade Mills is an American real estate agent, president of Jade Mills Estates, and the International Ambassador for Coldwell Banker Global Luxury. In 2019, Mills became the #1 real estate agent worldwide for Coldwell Banker, with over $6 billion in career sales. Mills' clients include Hollywood celebrities like Britney Spears, Jennifer Aniston, Charlie Sheen, and Sela Ward.

Career
Mills' first sale was a home for $42,000 in Van Nuys. She has appeared on Bloomberg TV and Fox News as a real estate expert. She serves as a board member for the Beverly Hills Chamber of Commerce and on the Board of Governors at Cedars Sinai Hospital.

Personal life
Mills is the daughter of a dairy farmer from Alamo, California.
She has been married three times. , she has four children and seven grandchildren.

References

Living people
Year of birth missing (living people)
American real estate brokers
People from Beverly Hills, California